ACFF may refer to:

 ACF Fiorentina, an Italian football club
American Conservation Film Festival
 Azerbaijani Culture Friends Foundation, a charity foundation in Azerbaijan